Queen Square or Queen's Square may refer to

Places

United Kingdom
 Queen Square, Bath, England
 Queen Square, Bristol, England
Queen Square House, Bristol
 Queen Square, London, England
 Queen Square bus station, Liverpool, England
 Queen Square, Wolverhampton, England

Elsewhere
 Queens Square, Fremantle, Australia
 Queen Square (Dartmouth), Nova Scotia, Canada
 Queen's Square, Sydney, Australia
 Republic Square, Valletta, formerly Queen's Square, Malta
 Queen's Square (Belize House constituency)

Other uses
 Queen Square reflex hammer, a medical instrument

See also 
The Queen's Square (disambiguation)

 King's Square (disambiguation)
 Royal Plaza (disambiguation)